Googlebot is the web crawler software used by Google that collects documents from the web to build a searchable index for the Google Search engine. This name is actually used to refer to two different types of web crawlers: a desktop crawler (to simulate desktop users) and a mobile crawler (to simulate a mobile user).

Behavior 

A website will probably be crawled by both Googlebot Desktop and Googlebot Mobile. However Google announced that, starting from September 2020, all sites were switched to mobile-first indexing, meaning Google is crawling the web using a smartphone Googlebot. The subtype of Googlebot can be identified by looking at the user agent string in the request. However, both crawler types obey the same product token (useent token) in robots.txt, and so a developer cannot selectively target either Googlebot mobile or Googlebot desktop using robots.txt.

If a webmaster chooses to restrict the information on their site available to a Googlebot, or another spider, they can do so with the appropriate directives in a robots.txt file, or by adding the meta tag <meta name="Googlebot" content="nofollow" /> to the web page. Googlebot requests to Web servers are identifiable by a user-agent string containing "Googlebot" and a host address containing "googlebot.com".

Currently, Googlebot follows HREF links and SRC links.  There is increasing evidence Googlebot can execute JavaScript and parse content generated by Ajax calls as well. There are many theories regarding how advanced Googlebot's ability is to process JavaScript, with opinions ranging from minimal ability derived from custom interpreters. Currently, Googlebot uses a web rendering service (WRS) that is based on the Chromium rendering engine (version 74 as on 7 May 2019). Googlebot discovers pages by harvesting every link on every page that it can find. Unless prohibited by a nofollow-tag, it then follows these links to other web pages. New web pages must be linked to from other known pages on the web in order to be crawled and indexed, or manually submitted by the webmaster.

A problem that webmasters with low-bandwidth Web hosting plans have often noted with the Googlebot is that it takes up an enormous amount of bandwidth.  This can cause websites to exceed their bandwidth limit and be taken down temporarily. This is especially troublesome for mirror sites which host many gigabytes of data. Google provides "Search Console" that allow website owners to throttle the crawl rate.

How often Googlebot will crawl a site depends on the crawl budget. Crawl budget is an estimation of how typically a website is updated. Technically, Googlebot's development team (Crawling and Indexing team) uses several defined terms internally to take over what "crawl budget" stands for. Since May 2019, Googlebot uses the latest Chromium rendering engine, which supports ECMAScript 6 features. This will make the bot a bit more "evergreen" and ensure that it is not relying on an outdated rendering engine compared to browser capabilities.

Mediabot 
Mediabot is the web crawler that Google uses for analyzing the content so Google AdSense can serve contextually relevant advertising to a web page. Mediabot identifies itself with the user agent string "Mediapartners-Google/2.1".

Unlike other crawlers, Mediabot does not follow links to discover new crawlable URLs, instead only visiting URLs that have included the AdSense code. Where that content resides behind a login, the crawler can be given a log in so that it is able to crawl protected content.

References

External links
Google's official Googlebot FAQ

Google software
Web crawlers
Internet bots
Google Search